Manoba javanica is a moth in the family Nolidae. It was described by van Eecke in 1920. It is found on Java.

References

Moths described in 1920
Nolinae